The men's 94 kilograms event at the 2006 Asian Games took place on December 5, 2006 at Al-Dana Banquet Hall in Doha.

Schedule
All times are Arabia Standard Time (UTC+03:00)

Records

Results

New records
The following records were established during the competition.

References

 Weightlifting Database
 Results

Weightlifting at the 2006 Asian Games